William Norman Hargreaves-Mawdsley (13 November 1921 – 11 April 1980) was a British historian, and expert on the history of legal and academic dress.

Biography
Hargreaves-Mawdsley was born in Bristol in 1921, where he attended Clifton College prior to matriculating at Oriel College, Oxford in 1940, where he read Classics and Modern History.  His academic studies were interrupted by World War II, during which he served in the Royal Army Ordnance Corps for five years, before returning to Oxford in 1946.  He graduated in 1948 and in 1955 commenced postgraduate research on the history of academic and legal dress.  He submitted his thesis in 1958 and was duly awarded the degree of DPhil. This thesis was embargoed in perpetuity at the author's request, but the Bodleian Library's catalogue indicates that it comprises 753 pages in three volumes, and the substantive content was published by the Clarendon Press in 1963 in two volumes.

After completing his doctoral research, he was appointed a tutor and librarian at Exeter College, Oxford, after which he took up a research fellowship at the University of Edinburgh (1961-1964), followed by a lectureship in history at the University of St Andrews (1964-1970).  He spent part of 1970 as a visiting professor at the University of South Carolina before his appointment later that year as professor and head of the Department of History at Brandon University in Manitoba.  He and his wife Josefina, whom he had married in 1959, returned to Oxford during the university vacations.  Between 1967 and 1979 he wrote several books on a variety of historical topics, many related to England and Spain during the seventeenth and eighteenth centuries.  He died suddenly of a heart attack in April 1980, while attending a university committee meeting.

Bibliography

References

1921 births
1980 deaths
Academic dress
British Army personnel of World War II
Royal Army Ordnance Corps soldiers
Military personnel from Bristol